Paul Robert (died 1961) was a Swiss fencer. He competed in the individual foil and épée events at the 1900 Summer Olympics.

References

External links
 

Year of birth missing
1961 deaths
Swiss male fencers
Olympic fencers of Switzerland
Fencers at the 1900 Summer Olympics
Date of death missing
Place of birth missing
Place of death missing